The Katherine E. Nash Gallery is an art gallery located at the University of Minnesota Department of Art on the West Bank of the Mississippi River in  Minneapolis, Minnesota in the United States. Founded by Katherine Nash during the 1970s, the gallery occupies  in the department's Regis Center for Art.

Notes

External links

 Katherine E. Nash Gallery (www.nash.umn.edu)
 Map via University of Minnesota (www.umn.edu)

Art museums and galleries in Minnesota
University of Minnesota
Tourist attractions in Minneapolis